Lukas Hupfauf (born 11 July 1997) is an Austrian footballer who plays as defender for German club FSV Frankfurt.

External links
 
 

1998 births
Living people
Austrian footballers
Austria youth international footballers
Association football defenders
FC Wacker Innsbruck (2002) players
FSV Frankfurt players
2. Liga (Austria) players
Austrian Football Bundesliga players
Regionalliga players
Austrian expatriate footballers
Expatriate footballers in Germany
Austrian expatriate sportspeople in Germany